William Winston Roper (August 22, 1880 – December 10, 1933) was an American football, basketball, and baseball player and coach.  He served as the head football coach at the Virginia Military Institute (1903–1904), Princeton University (1906–1908, 1910–1911, 1919–1930), the University of Missouri (1909), and Swarthmore College (1915–1916), compiling a career college football record of 112–38–18.  Roper's Princeton Tigers football teams of 1906, 1911, 1920, and 1922 have been recognized as national champions.  His 89 wins are the most of any coach in the history of the program.  Roper was also the head basketball coach at Princeton for one season in 1902–03, tallying a mark of 8–7.  Roper played football as an end, basketball, and baseball as an outfielder at Princeton, from which he graduated in 1902.  He was inducted into the College Football Hall of Fame as a coach in 1951.

Roper served on the NCAA Football Rules Committee.

Early life and playing career
Roper was born in Philadelphia, Pennsylvania, on August 22, 1880.  He attended the William Penn Charter School where he played football, basketball, and baseball.  He continued all three sports in college at Princeton University.

Coaching career

VMI
Roper was the sixth head football coach at Virginia Military Institute (VMI) in Lexington, Virginia, serving for two seasons, from 1903 to 1904, and compiling a record of 5–6. Roper had planned to study medicine, but was unable to, for health reasons. While a coach at VMI, he studied law, and later in life he became qualified as an attorney.

Princeton
In 1906, Roper was the head coach at Princeton and held that position through the 1908 season.  During his first stint as the head coach at Princeton, he compiled a 21–4–4 record.

Missouri
Roper coached football at the University of Missouri for the 1909 season, where his team went 7–0–1 and won the Missouri Valley Conference title.

Return to Princeton
His second stint at Princeton lasted from 1910 to 1911. During that tenure, he compiled a 15–1–2 record.

Swarthmore
In 1915 and 1916, Roper coached at Swarthmore College in Pennsylvania.  In his two seasons at Swarthmore, the team compiled a record of 11–4–1.

Third term at Princeton
In his final stint at Princeton, Roper held his longest-tenured coaching position.  His term lasted from 1919 to 1930, but ended due to an illness.  He continues to hold the record for most wins by a Princeton coach.

William Winston Roper Trophy
Princeton University's highest honor for a male athlete, the William Winston Roper Trophy, is named in his honor and awarded annually. Some of the more recent honorees have included NFL football player Dennis Norman (’01), NHL hockey player Cameron Atkinson (’03), lacrosse player Ryan Boyle (‘04), Olympic and world champion fencer Soren Thompson (‘05), MLB baseball player Will Venable (‘05), squash player Yasser El Halaby ('06), and lacrosse player Peter Trombino ('07).

Political and business career
In 1912, United States President Woodrow Wilson appointed Roper as the appraiser of merchandise at the Port of Philadelphia.  He was later a member of the Philadelphia City Council and the local manager of the Prudential Insurance Company.  As a politician he worked successfully to repeal prohibition, though he himself was a teetotaller, and to change Pennsylvania's blue laws, which did not allow sports on Sundays.

Head coaching record

Football

See also
 List of college football head coaches with non-consecutive tenure

References

External links
 
 

1880 births
1933 deaths
20th-century American politicians
American football ends
American men's basketball players
Baseball outfielders
Princeton Tigers baseball players
Princeton Tigers football coaches
Princeton Tigers football players
Princeton Tigers men's basketball coaches
Princeton Tigers men's basketball players
Missouri Tigers football coaches
Swarthmore Garnet Tide football coaches
VMI Keydets football coaches
College Football Hall of Fame inductees
Philadelphia City Council members
University of Virginia School of Law alumni
Businesspeople in insurance
Prudential Financial people
Coaches of American football from Pennsylvania
Players of American football from Philadelphia
Baseball players from Philadelphia
Basketball coaches from Pennsylvania